India competed at the 1976 Summer Olympics in Montreal, Quebec, Canada. This was the first Olympics since 1928 in which the Indian Men's hockey team did not win an Olympic Medal.

Competitors

Results by event

Athletics
Men's 800 metres
 Sriram Singh
 Heat — 1:45.86
 Semi Final — 1:46.42
 Final — 1:45.77 (→ 7th place)

Men's 10.000 metres
 Hari Chand
 Heat — 28:48.72 (→ did not advance)

Men's Long Jump
 T. C. Yohannan
 Heat — 7.67m (→ did not advance)

Men's Marathon
 Shivnath Singh — 2:16:22 (→ 11th place)

Hockey

Men's team competition
 Preliminary round (group A)
 Defeated Argentina (4-0)
 Lost to the Netherlands (1-3)
 Lost to Australia (1-6)
 Defeated Canada (3-0)
 Defeated Malaysia (3-0)
 Replay: Lost to Australia (1-1, 4-5 after penalty strokes)
 Classification Matches
 5th/8th place: Lost to West Germany (2-3)
 7th/8th place: Defeated Malaysia (2-0) → Seventh place
 Team roster
 ( 1.) Ajitpal Singh
 ( 2.) Vadivelu Phillips 
 ( 3.) Baldev Singh
 ( 4.) Ashok Diwan
 ( 5.) Billimoga Govinda
 ( 6.) Ashok Kumar
 ( 7.) Varinder Singh
 ( 8.) Harcharan Singh
 ( 9.) Mohinder Singh
 (10.) Aslam Sher Khan
 (11.) Syed Ali
 (12.) Bir Bhadur Chettri
 (13.) Chand Singh
 (14.) Ajit Singh
 (15.) Surjit Singh
 (16.) Vasudevan Baskaran
 Head coach: Gurbux Singh

Boxing
Rai Sik (Featherweight) – lost first round.

C.C Machaiah (Light Welterweight) – lost first round.

References

 Official Olympic Reports

Nations at the 1976 Summer Olympics
1976 Summer Olympics